William Allen Casselman (born November 27, 1941) is an American Canadian mathematician who works in representation theory and automorphic forms. He is a Professor Emeritus at the University of British Columbia. He is closely connected to the Langlands program and has been involved in posting all of the work of Robert Langlands on the internet.

Career
Casselman did his undergraduate work at Harvard College where his advisor was Raoul Bott and received his Ph.D from Princeton University in 1966 where his advisor was Goro Shimura. He was a visiting scholar at the Institute for Advanced Study in 1974, 1983, and 2001. He emigrated to Canada in 1971 and is a Professor Emeritus in mathematics at the University of British Columbia.

Research
Casselman specializes in representation theory, automorphic forms, geometric combinatorics, and the structure of algebraic groups. He has an interest in mathematical graphics and has been the graphics editor of the Notices of the American Mathematical Society since January, 2001.

Awards
In 2012, he became one of the inaugural fellows of the American Mathematical Society.

Selected publications

References

External links
 Publications of Bill Casselman
 Bill Casselman's Home Page  
 William Allen Casselman at the Mathematics Genealogy Project

1941 births
Group theorists
Algebraists
20th-century Canadian mathematicians
21st-century Canadian mathematicians
Academic staff of the University of British Columbia Faculty of Science
Institute for Advanced Study visiting scholars
Harvard College alumni
Princeton University alumni
Living people
Fellows of the American Mathematical Society
People from Glen Ridge, New Jersey